NGC 5384 is a lenticular galaxy in the constellation Virgo. It was discovered on May 8, 1864, by the astronomer Albert Marth. It is located about 250 million light-years (79.21 megaparsecs) away.

References

External links 
 

Virgo (constellation)
5384
Lenticular galaxies